Syracuse Savings Bank Building, also known as Bank of America building, is a historic building in Syracuse, New York designed by Joseph Lyman Silsbee.

It was built in 1875 adjacent to the Erie Canal, and, at 170 feet tall, was the tallest building in Syracuse.  It opened in 1876 as Syracuse Savings Bank.  Its passenger elevator, the first in Syracuse, was a curiosity that drew visitors.

History

The building's current principal tenant, in the first four floors, is Bank of America.  It was bought in 2007 by a limited liability corporation having four local principals for $1.75 million.

It is located at 102 N. Salina Street, across Erie Boulevard from the Gridley Building.

See also
List of Registered Historic Places in Onondaga County, New York

References

External links

Buildings and structures in Syracuse, New York
National Register of Historic Places in Broome County, New York
Historic American Buildings Survey in New York (state)
Bank buildings on the National Register of Historic Places in New York (state)